Gillespiana In Cologne  is a live album by Argentine-American composer, pianist and conductor Lalo Schifrin with soloists and the WDR Big Band recorded in-concert in Cologne, Germany in 1996. The concert was also broadcast on German radio and television.  The album was released to inaugurate Schifrin's Aleph Records label in 1998. It was the first recording of Schifrin's classic jazz suite since the debut recording by Dizzy Gillespie in 1960.

Playlist
Source =  

 Gillespiana Suite (Lalo Schifrin)
  Prelude   (7:08)
  Blues (12:09)
  Panamericana (5:26)
  Africana (13:56)
  Tocata (14:33)

 Bachianas Brasileiras No. 5 (Heitor Villa-Lobos, arranged by Schifrin) (8:46)

Personnel
Source =  

 Lalo Schifrin – piano, composer, arranger, conductor, album producer
 Jon Faddis – trumpet soloist
 Markus Stockhausen– trumpet soloist (from WDR Big Band)
 Paquito D'Rivera - alto sax soloist
 Heiner Wiberny – alto sax & flute soloist (from WDR Big Band)
 John Riley – drums (from WDR Big Band)
 Alex Acuña – Latin percussion
 Marcio Doctor – Latin percussion
—Production—
 Wolfgang Hirschmann – producer, recording & mixing engineer
 Reinhold Nickel – recording & mixing engineer
 Ruth Witt – digital editing
 Bobby Bee – mastering engineer

 WDR Big Band
 Andy Haderer, Rob Bruynen, Klaus Osterloh, John Marshall – trumpet
 Dave Horler, Ludwig Nuss, Bernt Laukamp – trombone
 Dietmar Florin – bass trombone
 Harald Rosenstein – alto sax
 Olivier Peters, Rolf Romer – tenor sax
 Jens Neufang – baritone sax
 Milan Lulic – guitar
 John Goldsby – bass
 Guest performers with WDR Big Band
 Andrew Joy, Charles Putnam, Kathleen Putnam, Mark Putnam – French horn
 Ed Partyka – tuba

See also
Westdeutscher Rundfunk (WDR)

References

Lalo Schifrin albums
1998 live albums
Albums arranged by Lalo Schifrin
Albums conducted by Lalo Schifrin